Lunar Sound is a professional recording studio located in Switzerland, owned and operated by producer/composer Richard Meyer (aka Swayd) who as worked with Mutt Lange for artists such as Britney Spears, The Corrs,  Céline Dion and Shania Twain. It is primarily a recording facility oriented in films/advertising music and sound design.

References

External links
 Lunarsound.com 

Recording studios in Switzerland